Ercole Drei (28 September 1886 – 1 October 1973) was an Italian sculptor. His work was part of the sculpture event in the art competition at the 1932 Summer Olympics.

References

Further reading
 Giuseppe Lipparini, Ercole Drei scultore, Bologna, Zanichelli, 1937
 Franco Bertoni, Ercole Drei scultore, 1886 – 1973, Imola, University Press, Bologna, 1986
 Valerio Rivosecchi, "DREI, Ercole", in Dizionario biografico degli italiani, vol. 41, Roma, Istituto dell'Enciclopedia Italiana, 1992.
 M. Quaesada, Ercole Drei in Secessione Romana 1913-1916
 F.Gualdoni, Scultura e ceramica in Italia nel novecento, Bologna, Electa, 1989, p. 164

1886 births
1973 deaths
20th-century Italian sculptors
20th-century Italian male artists
Italian male sculptors
Olympic competitors in art competitions
People from Faenza